Jyrki is a Finnish masculine given name and may refer to:

People
Jyrki 69 (born 1968), the lead vocalist for Finnish rock band The 69 Eyes
Jyrki Blom (born 1962), retired Finnish javelin thrower
Jyrki Hämäläinen (1942–2008), Finnish magazine editor
Jyrki Hakala (born 1960), Finnish sprint canoeist
Jyrki Heliskoski (born 1945), Finnish football coach
Jyrki Järvi (born 1966), Finnish sailor and Olympic champion
Jyrki Järvilehto (born 1966), better known as "JJ Lehto", a Finnish race car driver
Jyrki Jokipakka (born 1991), Finnish professional ice hockey defenceman
Jyrki Kähkönen (born 1967), retired Finnish athlete (110 metres hurdles)
Jyrki Kasvi (born 1964), Finnish politician
Jyrki Katainen (born 1971), the Prime Minister of Finland, chairman of the country's National Coalition Party
Jyrki Kiiskinen (born 1963), Finnish writer, recipient of the Eino Leino Prize in 1993
Jyrki Louhi, Finnish professional ice hockey forward
Jyrki Lumme (born 1966), retired Finnish professional ice hockey defenceman
Jyrki Niskanen, operatic tenor from Finland
Jyrki Otila (1941–2003), Finnish quiz show judge, Member of the European Parliament
Jyrki Parantainen (born 1962), Finnish photographer
Jyrki Pellinen (born 1940), Finnish writer and visual artist
Jyrki Ponsiluoma (born 1966), Swedish cross country skier
Jyrki Saranpää (born 1983), Finnish football player
Jyrki Seppä (born 1961), professional ice hockey player
Jyrki Välivaara (born 1976), Finnish professional ice hockey defenceman
Jyrki Yrttiaho (born 1952), Finnish politician, member of the Finnish Parliament

Other
Jyrki (TV show), Finnish TV show about popular music

Finnish masculine given names